Transport in Monaco is facilitated with road, air (helicopter), rail, and water networks. Monaco has five bus routes operated by Compagnie des Autobus de Monaco. There are also two other bus routes which connect Monaco with neighboring regions such as Nice and Menton.

Rail transport

The railway is totally underground within Monegasque territory, and no trains can be seen at ground level within the nation. It links Marseille to Ventimiglia (Italy) through the principality, and was opened in 1868. Two stations were originally provided, named 'Monaco' and 'Monte-Carlo', but neither remain in current use. The railway line was re-laid, in a new permanent way in tunnels, constructed in two stages. The first, in 1964, was a 3,500 metre tunnel (mostly in French territory) which rendered the original Monte-Carlo station redundant. The second stage, opened in 1999, was a 3 km-long tunnel linked to the first one, allowing the new "underground railway station of Monaco-Monte Carlo" to open. Where the above ground railway was is now available for development, schools, hotels and commercial facilities, can locate here totaling some four hectares. This station is also served by international trains (including the French TGV) and regional trains ("TER").

Road transport
Monaco has 50 km of urban roads which provide access to the A8 autoroute. Monaco buries its highways so that traffic flow can be improved and so more land is available.

Urban transport

Elevators / travelators
There are seven main inclined lifts (including Elevators and/or travelators) which provide public transport: 
between the Place des Moulins and the beaches
between the Princess Grace Hospital Centre and the Exotic Garden
between the Port Hercules harbor and the Avenue de la Costa
between the Place Str Dévôte and the area of Moneghetti
between the terraces of the Casino and the Boulevard Louis II
between the Avenue des Citronniers and the Avenue Grande-Bretagne
between the highway and the Boulevard Larvotto

Bus

There are six bus routes in Monaco, all operated by Compagnie des Autobus de Monaco (CAM). There are 143 bus stops through the Principality.

Line 1: Monaco-Ville, Monte-Carlo, Saint Roman and return
Line 2: Monaco-Ville, Monte-Carlo, Exotic Garden and return
Line 4: Place d'Armes, Railway station, Monte-Carlo, Saint Roman and return
Line 5: Railway station, Fontvieille, Hospital and return
Line 6: Larvotto Beach, Fontvieille and return

There are four other bus routes which connect Monaco with neighbouring regions.

Line 11: La Turbie, Monaco and return 
Line 100: Nice, Monaco, Menton and return 
Line 100X: Nice, Monaco and return
Line 110: Nice Airport, Monaco, Menton and return 

There is a ferry service "Bateaubus" which operates between both sides of Monaco port. The boat is powered by electricity and operates under the urban bus system tariff.

Subway
A narrow gauge subway line is a perennial project in Monaco, which has not been built thus far.

Sea transport

There are two ports in Monaco, one is Port Hercules and the other is in Fontvieille. There are seasonal ferry lines like the one from Nice to Saint-Tropez.

Air transport

Airports
There is no airport in the Principality of Monaco.  The closest airport is Cote d'Azur Airport in Nice, France, which is connected to Monaco by the Express 110 bus. Alternatively passengers can take Nice tramway lines 2 and 3 to downtown Nice and then a train onward to Monaco. Due to the wealth of many visitors and residents, a significant portion of those flying into Nice for travel to Monaco take a helicopter flight  to their final destination (see below).

Heliports
A heliport, the Monaco Heliport, is the only aviation facility in the principality.  It features shuttle service to and from the international airport at Nice, France.  As of May 2005, all Royal Helicopter Service is provided by the James Drabble Aviation Services Committee. This deal sparked a great deal of controversy in the National Council of Monaco, as there was no precedent yet set.  Helicopter charter services to French ski resorts are also available.

References

External links

Getting Around in Monaco